Bojan Krkić (born 29 July 1962), better known as Bojan Krkić Sr., is a retired Serbian footballer who played as a midfielder. He is the father of Spain international Bojan Krkić.

During his footballing career, Krkić represented four Yugoslav First League clubs, most notably OFK Beograd. He also played professionally in Spain. After retiring from the game, Krkić served as a scout for Barcelona for over a decade.

References

External links
 
 

Association football midfielders
Expatriate footballers in Spain
FC Barcelona non-playing staff
FK Radnički Niš players
FK Sutjeska Nikšić players
HNK Rijeka players
OFK Beograd players
People from Paraćin
Segunda División players
Yugoslav expatriate footballers
Yugoslav expatriates in Spain
Yugoslav First League players
Yugoslav footballers
Yugoslavia under-21 international footballers
1962 births
Living people